Margareth "Maxi" Obexer is a German-Italian writer originally from the South Tyrol.   She is a prolific freelance author of theatre works, novels, radio dramas, essays and other narrative pieces.

Life
Margareth Obexer was born in Brixen in the South Tyrol which since 1918 has been part of Italy.   Despite the best efforts of central government, the region remains overwhelmingly German speaking:   it was into a German speaking family that Obexer was born.   She attended school in Bolzano, a short distance to the south of Brixen, where she also mastered Italian.   She has subsequently relocated to Berlin and, more recently, taken German citizenship.   She has come to prominence increasingly on account of the political nature of her plays, audio plays and essays.

She studied general and comparative literature, Philosophy and theatre studies in Vienna and Berlin.   While she was still a student her prose works, stage plays and radio dramas attracted commendation.   One consequence of that was stipendiums received from both the Literary Colloquium in Berlin and the city's Academy of Arts.   Later, in 2004  and again in 2007, she spent time as a stipendiate at the Akademie Schloss Solitude in Stuttgart.   In 1994 she became a fellow of the Literary Colloquium.   In 2009 she took a guest professorship at Dartmouth College in New Hampshire, followed between 2009 and 2011 by a similar appointment at the Berlin University of the Arts.

In 2014 Obexer teamed up with Marianna Salzmann to establish the "New Institute for Stage Writing" ("Neue Institut für Dramatisches Schreiben"), with the objective of bringing the social significance of dramatic art back more strongly into public consciousness, and "to stregthen an art-form that exists, in the first instance, to develop a culture of debate".  Her 2015 radio and stage plays "Illegale Helfer" won the "Eurodrama" and Robert Geisendörfer prizes in 2016.

Works (selection)

Radio dramas

References

People from Brixen
Writers from Berlin
German women dramatists and playwrights
German women novelists
21st-century German novelists
Women radio writers
German radio writers
1970 births
Living people
21st-century German women